Chione is a monotypic genus of flowering plants in the family Rubiaceae containing the single species Chione venosa. It is native to the neotropics, occurring in most of Mexico, and throughout Central America, the Caribbean, Colombia, Ecuador, and Peru. It is typically a tree growing 10 to 20 meters tall. In harsh habitats, it may be dwarfed and shrubby. It has no known economic use.

Systematics
The genus Chione was erected by de Candolle in his Prodromus in 1830. The name of the genus is derived from the Greek word chion, meaning snow. The biological type for the genus are those plants which de Candolle called Chione glabra. These are now included in Chione venosa var. venosa but per ICN, Chione glabra retains its status as type.

Some authors have assigned as many as 15 species to Chione, but usually only one species is recognized, Chione venosa. In 2003, two species were removed from Chione and placed in a new genus, Colleteria. The remaining species of Chione were combined into one species, Chione venosa, with four varieties. Chione and Colleteria are the only genera in the subfamily Cinchonoideae that have not been assigned to a tribe. They will be placed in a tribe, possibly a new one, after further morphological study.

Varieties
Chione venosa var. buxifolia (Dwyer & M.V.Hayden) David W.Taylor - Panamá
Chione venosa var. cubensis (A.Rich.) David W.Taylor - Cuba, Haiti, Dominican Republic
Chione venosa var. mexicana (Standl.) David W.Taylor - Mexico
Chione venosa var. venosa - southern Mexico, Central America, Dominican Republic, Haiti, Puerto Rico, Trinidad, Lesser Antilles, Colombia, Ecuador, Perú

References

External links
Chione in the World Checklist of Rubiaceae
Chione In Prodromus Systematis Naturalis Regni Vegetabilis At Botanicus
 Chione At IPNI
 Chione In Index Nominum Genericorum At Smithsonian National Museum of Natural History
 Chione in Tropicos
 Chione At GRIN Taxonomy for Plants
 Chione At UniProt

Hamelieae
Flora of Mexico
Flora of the Caribbean
Flora of Central America
Flora of Colombia
Flora of Ecuador
Flora of Peru
Flora of Puerto Rico
Plants described in 1911
Flora without expected TNC conservation status